Dr Bernard Zoba, of the Republic of the Congo (Congo-Brazzaville), is Commissioner of Infrastructure and Energy for the African Union's African Commission.  Zoba was a signatory on behalf of the African Commission to an agreement between the Commission and France, in which the latter donated €5 million for the advancement of African Union activities.

External links
 Bernard Zoba bio

Living people
African Union Commission members
Republic of the Congo diplomats
Year of birth missing (living people)